One Frightened Night is a 1935 American comedy mystery film directed by Christy Cabanne and starring Charley Grapewin, Lucien Littlefield and Mary Carlisle. The film has entered the public domain.

Plot
Faced with an upcoming inheritance tax, multimillionaire Jasper Whyte summons a group of people to his mansion to announce that he is leaving each of them one million dollars.  This changes when he discovers a long lost granddaughter Doris Waverly who comes to his mansion; Jasper decides to leave his total fortune to her. Another Doris Waverly comes to the mansion and a murder is committed.

Cast 
Charley Grapewin as Jasper Whyte
Lucien Littlefield as Dr. Denham
Mary Carlisle as The Second Doris Waverly
Regis Toomey as Tom Dean
Arthur Hohl as Arthur Proctor
Fred Kelsey as Sheriff Jenks
Evalyn Knapp as The Fake Doris Waverly
Clarence Wilson as Mr. Felix
Wallace Ford as Joe Luvalle
Adrian Morris as Deputy Abner
Hedda Hopper as Laura Proctor
Rafaela Ottiano as Elvira - the Maid

External links 

1935 films
American black-and-white films
1930s comedy mystery films
Mascot Pictures films
Films directed by Christy Cabanne
1935 comedy films
American comedy mystery films
Films produced by Nat Levine
1930s English-language films
1930s American films